Cerium acetate is an inorganic compound with the chemical formula of Ce(CH3COO)3. It is a white powder that is soluble in water. Its 1.5 hydrate loses water at 133°C to obtain an amorphous anhydrous form, and the amorphous phase changes to crystal at 212°C, and phase changes again at 286°C.

Preparation 

Cerium acetate can be prepared by reacting cerium(III) carbonate and 50% acetic acid in an aqueous solution:

 Ce2(CO3)3 + 6 CH3COOH → 2 Ce(CH3COO)3 + 3 H2O + 3 CO2↑

Properties

Cerium acetate is soluble in water and ethanol in its anhydrous form (its hydrate is insoluble in ethanol), easily soluble in pyridine, and insoluble in acetone. Its thermal decomposition at 310 °C will generate basic cerium(III) acetate, which will be further decomposed to obtain Ce2O2CO3 (a basic carbonate), and continued heating generates CeO2 and CO.

References

Cerium(III) compounds
Acetates